Chaeron was a wrestler and tyrant from Pellene, ancient Achaea.

Chaeron won at the Isthmian Games, possibly twice, and four times at the Ancient Olympic Games, between 356 BC and 344 BC. Alexander the Great made him tyrant of Pellene. It is said that the people of Pellene refused to even mention Chaeron by his name. He may be the same person as Chaeron of Megalopolis.

He was believed to have exiled the aristocrats of Pellene and given their wives and property to their slaves, perhaps because of his study of Plato and Xenocrates. 

Athenaeus states

References 

Ancient Achaean athletes
Ancient Olympic competitors
Academic philosophers
4th-century BC philosophers
Ancient Greek tyrants